Nottingham Racecourse railway station was a station opened by the Great Northern Railway to serve Nottingham Racecourse in Nottingham, England.

History 
The Racecourse station was located on the extension built in 1857, when opened its own terminus at London Road, due to continuing problems with sharing the Midland Railway's Carrington Street station. The Great Northern took over the line from Grantham from the Ambergate, Nottingham, Boston and Eastern Junction Railway.

The station operated until the late 1960s when the line was shut down. There are still remnants of the station buildings on Colwick Road. Today the racecourse is served by Nottingham Station located two miles from the course.

References 

Disused railway stations in Nottinghamshire
Railway stations in Great Britain opened in 1857
Railway stations in Great Britain closed in 1959
Former Great Northern Railway stations
1857 establishments in England